Victor Ali Hassan Abondo (born 20 November 1989 in Kisumu) is a Kenyan footballer who currently plays for Wazito and the Kenya national team as a midfielder.

Career
On 30 August 2019, Abondo joined Wazito FC.

References

External links 
 
 

1989 births
Living people
Association football midfielders
Kenyan footballers
Kenyan expatriate footballers
Kenya international footballers
Kenyan Premier League players
South African Premier Division players
Tusker F.C. players
Gor Mahia F.C. players
Cape Town Spurs F.C. players
SoNy Sugar F.C. players
Bandari F.C. (Kenya) players
Bloemfontein Celtic F.C. players
Kenyan expatriate sportspeople in South Africa
Expatriate soccer players in South Africa
People from Kisumu County